"Holly" is a song written by Craig Smith and performed by Andy Williams.  The song reached #4 on the adult contemporary chart and #113 on the Billboard chart in 1967.

References

1967 singles
Andy Williams songs
Columbia Records singles